The Shakers are a sect of Christianity which practices celibacy, communal living, confession of sin, egalitarianism, and pacifism. After starting in England, the Shakers left that country for the English colonies in North America in 1774. As they gained converts, the Shakers established numerous communities in the late-18th century through the entire 19th century. The first villages organized in Upstate New York and the New England states, and, through Shaker missionary efforts, Shaker communities appeared in the Midwestern states. Communities of Shakers were governed by area bishoprics and within the communities individuals were grouped into "family" units and worked together to manage daily activities. By 1836 eighteen major, long-term societies were founded, comprising some sixty families, along with a failed commune in Indiana. Many smaller, short-lived communities were established over the course of the 19th century, including two failed ventures into the Southeastern United States and an urban community in Philadelphia, Pennsylvania. The Shakers peaked in population by the 1840s and early 1850s, with a membership between 4,000 and 9,000. Growth in membership began to stagnate by the mid 1850s. In the turmoil of the American Civil War and subsequent Industrial Revolution, Shakerism went into severe decline. As the number of living Shakers diminished, Shaker communes were disbanded or otherwise ceased to exist. Some of their buildings and sites have become museums, and many are historic districts under the National Register of Historic Places. The only active community is Sabbathday Lake Shaker Village in Maine, which is composed of at least three active members.

The first Shaker societies

The first Shaker community was established north of Albany, and was first called "Niskayuna", a rendering of the Indian name for the land. Later the town they were in was officially named Watervliet. That part of the town of Watervliet is now in the town of Colonie (since 1895), and the name Watervliet is now limited to the city of Watervliet (1896). In addition, Niskayuna is now the name of a town to the northwest. This has led to some confusion, because many historical accounts refer to them as the Niskayuna Shakers, while others refer to them as Watervliet Shakers. The Watervliet Shaker Historic District is where Mother Ann Lee was buried.

By 1780, the missionary work of the Shakers had attracted many new converts. An extensive series of trips throughout New England from 1781 through 1783 brought in followers across the entire region. Converts began appearing in New Lebanon and Canaan, New York; Hancock, Pittsfield, Richmond, Ashfield, Harvard, and Shirley, Massachusetts; and the states of Connecticut, New Hampshire, and Maine (then part of Massachusetts), among other locations.

In 1784, Ann Lee and her brother both died, leaving James Whittaker to lead the faith. By 1787, he too had died, and Joseph Meacham assumed the role as leader. Meacham appointed Lucy Wright of Pittsfield to co-lead, and under their auspices they organized a central village in New Lebanon, as well as organizing the original settlement of Watervliet. By 1790, the Hancock Village was also organized. After the formation of the New Lebanon, Watervliet, and Hancock communities, within three years nine more communities would organize in Massachusetts, Connecticut, New Hampshire, and Maine.

Settlement growth
The Shakers built more than 20 settlements that attracted at least 20,000 converts over the next century. Strict believers in celibacy, Shakers acquired their members through conversion, indenturing children, and adoption of orphans. Some children, such as Isaac N. Youngs, came to the Shakers when their parents joined, then grew up to become faithful members as adults.

As their communities grew, women and men shared leadership of the Shaker communities. Women preached and received revelations as the Spirit fell upon them. Thriving on the religious enthusiasm of the first and second Great Awakenings, the Shakers declared their messianic, communitarian message with significant response. One early convert observed: "The wisdom of their instructions, the purity of their doctrine, their Christ-like deportment, and the simplicity of their manners, all appeared truly apostolical." The Shakers represent a small but important Utopian response to the gospel. Preaching in their communities knew no boundaries of gender, social class, or education.

Village organization

Bishoprics
Shaker communities were grouped into bishoprics, which were governing units. The leadership team, called a ministry, resided in the bishopric's primary community. This ministry consisted of two men known as Elders and two women known as Eldresses. The New Lebanon Bishopric, the primary bishopric unit, was located in New York and included the Mount Lebanon and Watervliet Shaker Villages, as well as, after 1859, Groveland Shaker Village. In addition to its own member communities, the ministry of New Lebanon Bishopric oversaw all other Shaker bishoprics and communes. After New Lebanon closed in 1947, this central Ministry relocated to Hancock Shaker Village, and after the closure of that community in 1960, to Canterbury Shaker Village. When Canterbury closed in 1992, Sabbathday Lake Shaker Village remained as the last extant Shaker commune.

Family groups
A Shaker village was divided into groups or "families." The leading group in each village was the Church Family, and it was surrounded by satellite families that were often named for points on the compass rose. Managing each family was a leadership team consisting of two Elders and two Eldresses. Shakers lived together as brothers and sisters. Each house was divided so that men and women did most things separately. They used different staircases and doors. They sat on opposite sides of the room in worship, at meals, and in "union meetings" held to provide supervised socialization between the sexes. However, the daily business of a Shaker village required the brethren and sisters to interact, as did the dancing and other vigorous activity of their worship services. Though there was a division of labor between men and women, they also cooperated in carrying out many tasks, such as harvesting apples, food production, laundry, and gathering firewood. Every family was designed to be self-supporting with its own farm and businesses, but in times of hardship, other parts of the village, or even other Shaker villages, pitched in to help the afflicted.

Communities

Out-families, short-lived settlements, and missions 
Some organized In addition to the organized communities, other small and very short-lived communities emerged during the history of the Shakers, as well as various missions. These included:
 Numerous communities throughout New England: Cheshire, Ashfield, Richmond, Shelburne Falls, Turners Falls, Norton, Petersham, Grafton, Upton, and Rehoboth in Massachusetts; Windham, Preston, Stonington, and Saybrook, Connecticut; Guilford and Pittsford, Vermont; and Tuftonboro, New Hampshire. These emerged during the 1780s but were eventually absorbed into the larger Shaker communities.
 Two families in Canaan, New York. These began in 1813, and were part of the larger New Lebanon Village.
 Poland Hill at Poland, Maine. This community, founded by the former residents of Gorham when that village closed, served as the North Family and Gathering Order of the Sabbathday Lake Shaker Village.
 Drake's Creek, or the Mill Family, in Warren County, Kentucky, was a venture by the South Union, Kentucky, Shakers, to establish a water-powered mill some 16 miles removed from the South Union community itself. Begun in 1817, the venture proved unsuccessful and was shut down in 1829.
 A community in Darby Plains in Union County, Ohio, which existed from 1822-1823. Quickly abandoned, the Shakers there relocated to the Whitewater Settlement.
 Missions to Straight Creek and Eagle Creek in Ohio.
 A short-lived settlement at Red Banks, Kentucky.
 Missions to San Francisco and San Diego, California, in the 1880s and 1890s. Arthur W. Dowe, from Canterbury Shaker Village, operated a mission in San Francisco for several years in the early- and mid-1890s at 948 Mission Street. A small urban community of Shakers persisted in the city until the 1906 earthquake and ensuing fire. Cornelia R. Powers, of Watervliet Shaker Village, was in San Diego by the late 1880s and missionized there for several years.

Shaker village tourism
In the 19th century, hundreds of tourists visited Shaker villages, and many of them later wrote about their experiences there. Outsiders were invariably impressed by Shaker cleanliness, prosperity, and agriculture. Shaker food was delicious, and they were hospitable to outsiders. Shakers had a reputation for honesty and their products were the best of their kind.

Museums
 Alfred Shaker Museum, Alfred, Maine
 Canterbury Shaker Village, Canterbury, New Hampshire
 Enfield Shaker Museum, Enfield, New Hampshire
 Fruitlands Museum, Harvard, Massachusetts
 Hancock Shaker Village, Hancock, Massachusetts
 Pleasant Hill, Kentucky, Harrodsburg, Kentucky
 Sabbathday Lake Shaker Village, New Gloucester, Maine
 Shaker Historical Museum, Shaker Heights, Ohio
 Shaker Historical Society, Colonie, New York
 Shaker Museum  Mount Lebanon, New Lebanon, New York
 Shaker Museum at South Union, Auburn, Kentucky

Notes

Citations

References

Further reading
 Bishop, Rufus.  Elder Rufus Bishop’s Journals. 2 vols. Peter H. Van Demark, ed.  Clinton, N.Y.: Richard W. Couper Press, 2018.
 Brewer, Priscilla. Shaker Communities, Shaker Lives. Hanover, N.H.: University Press of New England, 1986.
 Brewer, Priscilla. "The Shakers of Mother Ann Lee," in America's Communal Utopias ed. by Donald E. Pitzer. (1997) pp. 37–56.
 Burns, Deborah E. Shaker Cities of Peace, Love, and Union: A History of the Hancock Bishopric. U. Press of New England, 1993. 246 pp.
 Eastman, Harland H. "Alfred, Maine : The Shakers And The Village" (1986).
 Foster, Lawrence. Women, Family, and Utopia: Communal Experiments of the Shakers, the Oneida Community, and the Mormons (1991).
 Gutek, Gerald and Gutek, Patricia. Visiting Utopian Communities: A Guide to the Shakers, Moravians, and Others. U. of South Carolina Press, 1998. 230 pp.
 Kelly, Andrew. Kentucky by Design: The Decorative Arts and American Culture, with an Emphasis on the Shaker Communities at Pleasant Hill and South Union.  University Press of Kentucky, 2015.  
 Murray, John E. "A Demographic Analysis of Shaker Mortality Trends." Communal Societies. Volume 13 (1993): 22–44.
 Murray John E. "Determinants of Membership Levels and Duration in a Shaker Commune, 1780–1880". Journal for the Scientific Study of Religion 34 (1995): 35–48. In JSTOR
 Murray, John E. "The white plague in utopia: tuberculosis in nineteenth-century Shaker communes." Bulletin of the History of Medicine: 1994, volume 68: 278–306; erratum, 510.
 Paterwic, Stephen. "From Individual to Community: Becoming a Shaker at New Lebanon, 1780–1947." Communal Societies, Volume 11 (1991): 18–33.
 Paterwic, Stephen J. "Mysteries of the Tyringham Shakers Unmasked: A New Examination of People, Facts, and Figures." Historical Journal of Massachusetts. (Winter 2003).
 Portman, Rob and Cheryl Bauer. Wisdom's Paradise: The Forgotten Shakers of Union Village. Wilmington, Ohio: Orange Frazer Press, 2004. . (About the Warren County, Ohio settlement.)
 Pushkar-Pasewicz, Margaret. "Kitchen Sisters and Disagreeable Boys: Debates over Meatless Diets in Nineteenth-Century Shaker Communities." in Eating in Eden: Food and American Utopias. Etta M. Madden and Martha L. Finch, eds. University of Nebraska Press, 2006. pp. 109–24.
 Rotundo, Barbara. "Crossing the Dark River: Shaker Funerals and Cemeteries." Communal Societies. Volume 7 (1987): 36–46.
 Sasson, Diane. "Individual Experience, Community Control, and Gender: The Harvard Shaker Community During the Era of Manifestations," Communal Societies 13 (1993): 45–70.
 Shaker Autobiographies, Biographies and Testimonies, 1806-1907. 3 vols. Glendyne Wergland and Christian Goodwillie, eds. London, England: Pickering & Chatto, 2014.
 Sprigg, June. Simple Gifts: Lessons in Living from a Shaker Village. New York: Random House, 1998.
 Stiles, Lauren A. "'Rather Than Ever Milk Again': Shaker Sisters' Refusal to Milk at Mount Lebanon and Watervliet—1873–1877." American Communal Societies Quarterly. Volume 3.1 (2009):13–25.
 Thurman, Suzanne R. "O Sisters Ain't You Happy?": Gender, Family, and Community among the Harvard and Shirley Shakers, 1781–1918. Syracuse University Press, 2002. pp. 262.
 Thurman, Suzanne. "'No idle hands are seen': The Social Construction of Work in Shaker Society." Communal Societies. Volume 18 (1998): 36–52.
 Wergland, Glendyne R. Sisters in the Faith: Shaker Women and Equality of the Sexes. Amherst: University of Massachusetts Press, 2011.
 Wertkin, Gerard C. The Four Seasons of Shaker Life: An Intimate Portrait of the Community at Sabbathday Lake. Photographs by Ann Chwasky. Simon & Schuster, 1986. pp. 189.
 Youngs, Isaac Newton. Isaac Newton Youngs’s Concise View of the Millennial Church. Glendyne Wergland and Christian Goodwillie, eds. Clinton, N.Y.: Richard W. Couper Press, 2017.

External links
 Map of Historic Shaker sites
 Shakerpedia.com
Settlements
 Alfred Shaker Village, Alfred, Maine
 Canterbury Shaker Village, Canterbury, New Hampshire
 Enfield Shaker Village, Enfield, New Hampshire; Enfield Shaker Singers, Enfield, New Hampshire
 Hancock Shaker Village, Hancock, Massachusetts
 Shaker Museum | Mount Lebanon, New Lebanon, New York
 Pleasant Hill Shaker Village, Pleasant Hill, Kentucky
 Sabbath Day Lake Shakers, Maine; Interview of the Sabbath Day Lake Shakers; Sabbath Day Lake Shaker Library and Museum 
 Shirley Shaker Village, Shirley, Massachusetts
 South Union Shaker Village, South Union, Kentucky
Whitewater Shaker Village, Whitewater, Ohio

Shakers